Torbat Heydarieh University of Medical Sciences is a medical sciences university in Torbat Heydarieh, Razavi Khorasan, Iran. The university has three school including health, para-medicine, and nursing & midwifery.

References

External links
Official website

Torbat-e Heydarieh County
Medical schools in Iran